The County of Gladstone is one of the 37 counties of Victoria which are part of the cadastral divisions of Australia, used for land titles. It is located between the Avoca River in the west and Loddon River and Bet Bet Creek in the east. The county was proclaimed in 1870.

Parishes 
Parishes include:
 Archdale, Victoria
 Barp, Victoria
 Barrakee, Victoria
 Bealiba
 Berrimal, Victoria
 Bet Bet, Victoria
 Borung, Victoria
 Brenanah, Victoria
 Buckrabanyule, Victoria
 Charlton East, Victoria
 Coonooer East, Victoria
 Dunolly, Victoria
 Glenalbyn, Victoria
 Glenloth, Victoria
 Glenmona, Victoria
 Gowar, Victoria
 Inglewood, Victoria
 Kangderaar, Victoria
 Kingower, Victoria
 Kinypanial, Victoria
 Kooreh, Victoria
 Kooroc, Victoria
 Korong, Victoria
 Kurraca, Victoria
 Kurting, Victoria
 Moliagul, Victoria
 Mysia, Victoria
 Narrewillock, Victoria
 Natteyallock, Victoria
 Painswick, Victoria
 Powlett, Victoria
 Rathscar, Victoria
 Salisbury West, Victoria
 Tarnagulla, Victoria
 Tchuterr, Victoria
 Terrappee, Victoria
 Waanyarra, Victoria
 Wareek, Victoria
 Wedderburne, Victoria
 Wehla, Victoria
 Woosang, Victoria
 Wychitella, Victoria
 Yalong, Victoria
 Yalong South, Victoria
 Yeungroon, Victoria

References
Vicnames, place name details
Research aids, Victoria 1910
	Map of the counties of Gunbower, Gladstone, Bendigo, John Sands, 1886, National Library of Australia

Counties of Victoria (Australia)